Casey McKee (born 1976, Mesa, Arizona) is an American artist.

McKee's work has appeared in many exhibitions such as the Village People at Kunstverein Wolfsburg, Germany, "Human Conditions"  at the Scottsdale Museum of Contemporary Art in Scottsdale, Arizona, and "UN/FAIR TRADE - Die Kunst der Gerechtigkeit" at the Neue Galerie Graz am Landesmuseum Joanneum in Graz, Austria. In 2011 his work was featured in the 4th Moscow Biennale of Contemporary Art in Moscow, Russia.  He is represented by Galerie Greulich in Frankfurt, Germany.

McKee's process is a combination of photography and painting. He first creates the photograph and then prints it onto the surface (e.g. canvas, wood panel, handmade paper, etc.), using a photographic emulsion. McKee spends the majority of time working with oil paint to bring out the desired expression in his works.

McKee's work is included in the permanent collection of the Scottsdale Museum of Contemporary Art – SmoCA, Scottsdale, Arizona, The Phoenix Art Museum Phoenix, Arizona, The Tucson Museum of Contemporary Art Tucson, Arizona, the Phynque Phamily Phoundation museum Minneapolis, Minnesota, the SØR Rusche Oelde/Berlin Collection in Berlin, Germany, The National Arts Club in New York, New York and the Ömer Koç Collection, Istanbul, Turkey.

References

External links

Casey McKee interview with Empty Kingdom
Casey McKee at Galerie Greulich, Frankfurt
https://artfacts.net/artist/casey-mckee/82967

1976 births
Living people
20th-century American painters
American male painters
21st-century American painters
20th-century American male artists